Shukra (Sanskrit: शुक्र,) is a Sanskrit word that means "clear" or "bright". It also has other meanings, such as the name of an ancient lineage of sages who counselled the asuras in Vedic mythology. In medieval mythology and Hindu astrology, the term refers to the planet Venus, one of the Navagrahas.

Hinduism 

In Hinduism, Shukra is one of the sons of Bhrigu, of the third Manu, one of the saptarishis. He was the guru of Daityas and Asuras, and is also referred to as Shukracharya or Asuracharya in various Hindu texts. In another account found in the Mahabharata, Shukra divided himself into two, one half becoming the fount of knowledge for the devas (gods) and the other half being the knowledge source of the asuras (demons). Shukra, in the Puranas, is blessed by Shiva with Sanjeevini Vidhya after worshipping and impressing Shiva with his devotion. Sanjeevini Vidhya is the knowledge that raises the dead back to life, which he used from time to time to restore life to the asuras. Later, this knowledge was sought by the devatas and was ultimately gained by them.

Shukra's mother was Kavyamata, whilst Shukra's wives were the goddesses Urjasvati, Jayanti, and Sataparva. Sometimes, Urjjasvati and Jayanti are considered to be one goddess. With her, Shukra produced many children including, Queen Devayani. Sataparva was childless.

In the Mahabharata, Shukracharya is mentioned as one of the mentors of Bhishma, having taught him political science in his youth.

Astrology

In classical Vedic astrology or Jyotisha, Shukra is considered to be among the Navagrahas (Nine planets) that influence the pattern of life on earth. Shukra represents women, beauty, wealth, luxury, and sex. According to classical astrological texts, a powerfully placed Shukra, aspected by benefic planets such as Jupiter, and in favourable signs and houses in the birth chart, ensures material well-being. Its beej mantra is "Om Draam Dreem Draum Sah Shukraya Namaha". It is associated with Friday, and the gem diamond. The classical shastras ordain that the best method to attain the blessings of Shukra is to respect the women in one’s life.

It is also popularly propitiated through Devi Aradhana or worshipping the goddess Lakshmi.

Planet

Shukra as a planet appears in various Hindu astronomical texts in Sanskrit, such as the 5th century Aryabhatiya by Aryabhatta, the 6th century Romaka by Latadeva and Panca Siddhantika by Varahamihira, the 7th century Khandakhadyaka by Brahmagupta and the 8th century Sisyadhivrddida by Lalla. These texts present Shukra as one of the planets and estimate the characteristics of the respective planetary motion. Other texts such as Surya Siddhanta dated to have been complete sometime between the 5th century and 10th century present their chapters on various planets with deity mythologies.

The manuscripts of these texts exist in slightly different versions, present Shukra's motion in the skies, but vary in their data, suggesting that the text were open and revised over their lives.

The 1st millennium CE Hindu scholars had estimated the time it took for sidereal revolutions of each planet including Shukra, from their astronomical studies, with slightly different results:

Calendar and zodiac
The weekday Shukravara in Hindu calendar, or Friday, has roots in Shukra (Venus). Shukravara is found in most Indian languages, and Shukra Graha is driven by the planet Venus in Hindu astrology. The word "Friday" in the Greco-Roman and other Indo-European calendars is also based on the planet Venus.

Shukra is a part of the Navagraha in Hindu zodiac system. The Navagraha developed from early works of astrology over time. Deifying planetary bodies and their astrological significance occurred as early as the Vedic period and was recorded in the Vedas. The classical planets, including Venus, were referenced in the Atharvaveda around 1000 BCE. The planet Venus was deified and referred to as Shukra in various Puranas.

See also
Varuna
Ahura Mazda
Venus (astrology)
Venus (mythology)
 Navagraha
 List of Navagraha temples
 Nakshatra
 List of Natchathara temples
 Jyotisha
 Saptarishi
 List of Hindu deities
Vishnu

References

Further reading

Navagraha
Venusian deities
Rishis
Danavas